Shift Technologies, Inc. is an American company that maintains an online marketplace for buying and selling used cars. Founded in 2014, Shift is based in San Francisco’s Mission District. , the company offers its services in the San Francisco Bay Area, Los Angeles, and Portland, OR.

History 
Shift was founded in 2013 by: George Arison, Toby Russell, Minnie Ingersoll, Christian Ohler, Joel Washington and Morgan Knutson. The company was incorporated in 2014, and first launched in San Francisco in 2015.

The company initially served as an intermediary that bought and sold used cars on a consignment basis. The company then began acquiring cars outright and reselling them on its platform direct to buyers, removing the peer-to-peer consignment model.

As a private company, Shift received funding from Lithia Motors Inc., Goldman Sachs Investment Partners (GSIP), Draper Fisher Jurvetson (DFJ), Highland Capital Partners, SV Angel, Great Oaks Venture Capital, DCM Ventures and others. As of 2019, Shift has raised approximately $300 million, a mix of debt and equity.

In June 2020, Shift announced that it would engage in a merger with a special-purpose acquisition company (SPAC) called Insurance Acquisition Corp., then a public company listed on the Nasdaq under the ticker symbol INSU. Following the completion of the merger with Insurance Acquisition Corp. in October 2020 it was listed under the ticker SFT with a valuation of $415.9 million.

In 2021, Shift posted $637 million in revenue, which represented over 3 times year-over year growth. 

In 2022, Shift announced an agreement to acquire the dealer listing marketplace assets of Fair Technologies, which will enable dealers and independent sellers to list their cars alongside Shift’s own inventory. The acquisition closed on May 12, 2022.

On August 9th, 2022, Shift announced that it plans to merge with used-vehicle consignment company CarLotz. The merger is anticipated to be completed by the end of the year.

Business model 
Shift buys and sells used cars directly to and from consumers through its ecommerce platform. It facilitate financing options, inspections, Department of Motor Vehicles interactions, detailing, pricing and merchandising. Once Shift acquires a car, it inspects and repairs it through its regional reconditioning centers. From there, the company lists cars on its website where consumers can purchase the car online. All cars sold through Shift receive a 150-point inspection prior to being sold, and include a seven-day, 200-mile return policy.

References

External links

Peer-to-peer
Transportation in Los Angeles
Companies based in San Francisco
Retail companies established in 2014
Internet properties established in 2014
Online marketplaces of the United States
Automotive websites
Auto dealerships of the United States
Companies listed on the Nasdaq